Alice Maud Krige (born 28 June 1954) is a South African actress and producer. Her first feature film role was in Chariots of Fire (1981) as the Gilbert and Sullivan singer Sybil Gordon. She played the dual role of Eva Galli/Alma Mobley in Ghost Story (1981) and the Borg Queen in Star Trek: First Contact (1996).

Early life and education
Krige was born in Upington, Cape Province (now Northern Cape), South Africa, the daughter of Patricia, a professor of psychology, and Louis Krige, a physician. The Kriges later moved to Port Elizabeth, where Alice grew up in what she has described as a "very happy family", with two brothers, one of whom became a physician and the other a Professor of Surgery.

Krige attended Rhodes University in Grahamstown, South Africa with plans to become a clinical psychologist. She turned to acting after taking an acting class at Rhodes, then completed a Bachelor of Arts degree and a BA Hons degree in drama, with distinction. She went on to London to attend the Central School of Speech and Drama.

Career
Krige made her professional debut on British television in 1979, and appeared as Lucie Manette in the television movie A Tale of Two Cities. She went on to play Sybil Gordon in Chariots of Fire and Eva Galli/Alma Mobley in Ghost Story, both in 1981. She earned a Plays and Players Award, as well as a Laurence Olivier Award for Most Promising Newcomer, after appearing in a 1981 West End theatre production of George Bernard Shaw's Arms and the Man. 

She then joined the Royal Shakespeare Company, playing Cordelia in King Lear and in Edward Bond's Lear, Miranda in The Tempest, Bianca in The Taming of the Shrew, and Roxanne in Cyrano de Bergerac. She also appeared in plays such as Thomas Otway's Venice Preserv'd at the Almeida Theatre in London and Toyer at the Arts Theatre in the West End.

Krige played Bathsheba in King David (1985) and Mary Shelley in Haunted Summer (1988), and has appeared in such horror films as Ghost Story, Sleepwalkers, Silent Hill and Gretel & Hansel.

In Star Trek: First Contact, Krige played the Borg Queen, who attempts to assimilate Earth into the Borg collective. She won Best Supporting Actress at the 1997 Saturn Awards for that role. She returned to this character in the Star Trek game Star Trek: Armada II and in the Star Trek: Voyager series finale "Endgame" in 2001. In 2021, she reprised her role as the Borg Queen in voice only for the animated series Star Trek: Lower Decks. Her science fiction career has expanded into television, with prominent roles in miniseries adaptations of Dinotopia and Frank Herbert's Children of Dune. She worked with the Brothers Quay in "The Institute Benjamenta, or This Dream That People Call Life" and with Guy Maddin in "Twilight of the Ice Nymphs".

In April 2004, Krige was awarded an honorary Litt.D. degree from Rhodes University.

Krige starred in a number of made-for-television movies and miniseries. She appeared in the television movies Baja Oklahoma (1988) and Ladykiller (1992) and the miniseries Ellis Island (1984) and Scarlet and Black (1993). She played Natalie Wood's mother in The Mystery of Natalie Wood (2004), and starred as Joan Collins in Dynasty: The Making of a Guilty Pleasure. She had recurring roles on Deadwood, and guest starred on Six Feet Under, Law & Order: Criminal Intent, The 4400 and Dirty Sexy Money.

In 2008, she had a leading role as Sannie Laing, Sandra's mother, in Skin, the biopic about Sandra Laing. The film explores the issues of the girl being classified as "Coloured" by the South African authorities during Apartheid, although her parents were white. In 2011, Krige appeared in the BBC's final season of Spooks, playing Russian double agent Elena Gavrik. Krige also featured in the final season of the BBC drama Waking the Dead, in 2011. In recent years, Krige appeared in films Solomon Kane, The Sorcerer's Apprentice and Thor: The Dark World. She played the role of Amira in the first and second series of Tyrant for F/X, and has recently worked for the BBC on the series The Syndicate and Partners in Crime. In 2016, she appeared on the Netflix mystery series The OA.

In 2012, Krige produced the award-winning feature Jail Caesar, an exploration of the little known adolescence of Julius Caesar, filmed in three working prisons with several hundred serving prisoners and an assemble of actors including Derek Jacobi and John Kani. Jail Caesar was written and directed by Paul Schoolman.

In 2015, Krige received the Special Jury Award at the International Film Festival for Peace, Inspiration and Equality in Jakarta, along with Andy Garcia and Jimmy Carter for her performance in the film Shingetsu, in which she plays a war-traumatised surgeon of Doctors Without Borders, opposite Gunter Singer.

Personal life
Krige married writer and director Paul Schoolman in 1988.

Filmography

Film

Television

References

Further reading
 Gagne, Paul R. (February 1982). "'Ghost Story' From Novel to Film". Cinefantastique Magazine. pp. 20–39

External links

 
 
 
 Alice Krige interview at www.sci-fi-online.com
 Alice Krige at Who's Who Southern Africa

1954 births
Living people
20th-century South African actresses
21st-century South African actresses
Alumni of the Royal Central School of Speech and Drama
Royal Shakespeare Company members
South African film actresses
South African film producers
South African television actresses
South African expatriates in England
South African people of German descent
Afrikaner people
People from Upington
Shakespearean actresses
Rhodes University alumni
Laurence Olivier Award winners